Isaac B. "Ike" Benners (June 7, 1856 – April 18, 1932) was an American Major League Baseball player who played mainly left field for two teams during his lone Major League season, the Brooklyn Atlantics of the American Association and Wilmington Quicksteps of the Union Association.  Benners died at the age of 75 in his hometown of Philadelphia, and is interred at Fernwood Cemetery in Fernwood, Pennsylvania.

References

External links

 

1856 births
1932 deaths
Baseball players from Philadelphia
Major League Baseball outfielders
19th-century baseball players
Brooklyn Atlantics (AA) players
Wilmington Quicksteps players
Worcester Grays players
Wilmington Quicksteps (minor league) players
Portland (minor league baseball) players
Columbus Stars (baseball) players
Burials at Fernwood Cemetery (Lansdowne, Pennsylvania)